Adad-Nirari or Addu-Nirari was a king of Nuhašše in the 14th century BC. His identity and succession order is debated as well as the  extent of his kingdom which might have included Qatna. Adad-Nirari engaged in a military struggle again the Hittite king Šuppiluliuma I, asking Egypt for help and invading the kingdom of Ugarit, a Hittite vassal. Those actions prompted Šuppiluliuma to invade the region and relive Ugarit. Adad-Nirari's fate is unknown as he disappeared from records.

Reign and wars
Adad-Nirari is known through two documents; the letter codenamed (EA 51) sent by the Nuhaššite king to the pharaoh of Egypt, and the so-called "Niqmaddu Treaty" between Šuppiluliuma I and the Ugaritic king Niqmaddu II. Following his second Syrian foray, Šuppiluliuma sent an offer of alliance to the Nuhaššite king; Adad-Nirari rejected, and despite being a vassal of Mitanni, he sent the letter codenamed (EA 51) to ask Egypt for help and troops. Adad-Nirari might have asked Mitanni for help but the latter was unable to send it and it seems that Egypt did not respond as well.

Nuhašše revolted against the Hittites, but Ugarit, which was sent an alliance offer by Šuppiluliuma, eventually accepted the vassalage; Adad-Nirari allied himself with Niya and Mukiš then attacked Ugarit. According to Niqmaddu II, the troops of Adad-Nirari and his allies seized the cities of Ugarit, took booty and devastated the land. Thomas Richter believes that the coalition's attack triggered Šuppiluliuma's first Syrian war. The Hittite king, after receiving an appeal from his Ugaritic vassal, sent an army which defeated the coalition; the fate of Adad-Nirari is unknown as the Hittites make no mention of what happened to him.

Chronological order and identity

As king of Nuhašše
There is a great deal of confusion over the identity of Adad-Nirari as king of Nuhašše and his position in the succession of the Nuhaššite monarchs. The Hittite documents mention two kings of Nuhašše in the first Syrian war; in the Niqmaddu treaty, "Adad-Nirari" is mentioned. In the Hittite-Mitannian treaty (the Shattiwaza treaty, concluded during the second Syrian war), and the treaty between Šuppiluliuma and the Nuhaššite king Tette, "Šarrupši" is mentioned. Most scholars agree that the events mentioned in the Niqqmadu and Shattiwaza treaties depict the events of the first Syrian war. Judging by letter (EA 51), Adad-Nirari was the king during the first Syrian war. However, the treaty with Tette makes it clear that Šarrupši was the king when Šuppiluliuma attacked Išuwa, an event which started the first Syrian war as the Shattiwaza treaty shows. Many scholars dealt with the problem and offered different and contradictory opinions:
Adad-Nirari preceded Šarrupši: according to Richter, in the beginning of the first Syrian war, the king of Nuhašše was Adad-nirari and Šarrupši was a Hittite protégé put on the throne by Šuppiluliuma. Richter does not explain the Shattiwaza treaty's silence over the fate of Adad-Nirari. Amnon Altman suggested that Šarrupši was a claimant to the throne and the reason for not mentioning the fate of Adad-Nirari in the treaty of Shattiwaza is, according to Altman: "Adad-Nirari was not mentioned, because he managed to escape from the Hittites, and Šuppiluliuma for some reason took it as a disgrace and sign of not full submission of Nuhašše and thus decided not to mention Adad-Nirari in the Šattiwaza treaty at all." Altman himself admits that his answer is inadequate.
Šarrupši preceded Adad-Nirari: Trevor R. Bryce considered Šarrupši to have accepted the Hittite vassalage causing Tushratta of Mitanni to kill him; he was succeeded by Adad-Nirari who also belonged to the royal family and was willing to be a vassal of Mitanni. Jacques Freu suggested that the date of the Nuhaššite attack on Ugarit followed the end of the first Syrian war, and took place at the beginning of the six-year war (second Syrian war). Freu's hypothesis have Šarrupši ruling during the first Syrian war, a predecessor of Adad-Nirari.
Adad-Nirari and Šarrupši are the same person: Daria Gromova suggested that Adad-Nirari was the Amorite name of the king while Šarrupši was his Hurrian name. This was not a unique situation in the Near East when a ruling class had a foreign ethnic roots which was the case in Nuhašše as the population was West-Semitic while the monarchs had Hurrian names.
Adad-Nirari ruled simultaneously with Šarrupši: Horst Klengel suggested this solution but this does not explain why the treaty of Shattiwaza makes no mention of Adad-Nirari who was the main insurgent from Nuhašše.
Adad-Nirari interrupted the reign of Šarrupši: also suggested by Klengel who maintained that Adad-Nirari usurped Šarrupši's throne for a short period before being overthrown and Šarrupši reinstated.

As a possible king of Qatna
The inventories of Qatna mentions a king named Adad-Nirari; Michael Astour suggested identifying the Qatanite king with the Nuhaššite monarch and was followed by Richter, who believes that Adad-Nirari ruled Qatna through a šakkanakku (military governor) called Lullu mentioned in the Qatanite inventories. The hypothesis of Richter presents Adad-Nirari of Nuhašše as the ruler of a vast state, the second Syrian power after Mitanni, who was removed by the Hittites and had his kingdom split into three parts: Nuhašše itself, Qatna and Ugulzat.

The Shattiwaza treaty clearly mentioned Qatna as a different realm from Nuhašše during the first Syrian war; If Qatna was part of the Nuhaššite kingdom, its submission to the Hittites would not have been mentioned separately. Freu rejected Richter's hypothesis; citing different arguments, he concluded that Adad-Nirari of Nuhašše was a contemporary of Idadnda of Qatna, a successor of the Qatanite Adad-Nirari.

Notes

References

Citations

Sources

14th-century BC rulers
Ancient Syria
Rulers of Syria
14th-century BC Near Eastern people